NHO Transport, formerly the Federation of Norwegian Transport Companies (TL) is an employers' organisation in Norway, organized under the national Confederation of Norwegian Enterprise. It is also a member of the International Association of Public Transport and the International Road Transport Union.

It was established in 1929 under the name Norges Rutebileieres Forbund. On 1 February 2011, the name was changed to NHO Transport.

The current Director General is Christian Aubert. Chairman of the board is Harald Vålandsmyr.

References

External links
Official site

Employers' organisations in Norway
Organizations established in 1929
1929 establishments in Norway
Transport in Norway